Limnonectes modestus is a species of frog in the family Dicroglossidae.
It is endemic to Indonesia.

Its natural habitats are subtropical or tropical moist lowland forest, subtropical or tropical mangrove forest, subtropical or tropical moist montane forest, rivers, intertidal marshes, rural gardens, urban areas, and heavily degraded former forest. It is not considered threatened by the IUCN.

References

Amphibians of Indonesia
modestus
Taxonomy articles created by Polbot
Amphibians described in 1882